Netupitant/palonosetron, sold under the brand name Akynzeo, is a fixed-dose combination medication used for the prevention of acute and delayed chemotherapy-induced nausea and vomiting. It is marketed and distributed by Helsinn Therapeutics. Netupitant is an NK1 receptor antagonist and palonosetron is a 5-HT3 receptor antagonist.

The capsules contain netupitant and palonosetron hydrochloride. The intravenous version is a combination of fosnetupitant chloride hydrochloride and palonosetron hydrochloride.

Contraindications
Netupitant/palonosetron may be contraindicated during pregnancy.

Adverse effects
The most common side effects include headache, weakness, fatigue, upset stomach, constipation, and skin redness. The overall profile of adverse effects is comparable to that of palonosetron (see Palonosetron#Adverse effects); no common adverse effects can be attributed to netupitant.

Interactions

Pharmacology

History
Netupitant/palonosetron was approved for use in the United States in October 2014. It was approved for use in the European Union in May 2015. The intravenous version, which contains the prodrug fosnetupitant in place of netupitant, was approved in the United States in April 2018.

References

External links
 
 
 

Antiemetics
Combination drugs